Dong Seoul Bus Terminal is a bus terminal located in 50 Gangbyeonyeokro (Gu-wi dong 546-1), Gwangjin-gu, Seoul, South Korea. It is in front of Seoul Subway Line 2 Gangbyeon Station.

It was constructed in 1987, and established in 1990. One if the station goal was to serve the new Jungbu Expressway. The terminal is operated by Dong Seoul Terminal Operations Corp, but the company is owned by Hanjin.

This terminal uses two national terminal codes, buses which go to Chungchung and Gyeongsang uses code 031, and which go to Gangwon and Jeolla uses 032. This terminal is heavily used by soldiers from multiple military bases in Gangwon Province.

See also 
 Gangbyeon Station

References

External links 
 

Bus stations in South Korea
1990 establishments in South Korea
20th-century architecture in South Korea